Anderson ZurMuehlen & Co., P.C., is a certified public accounting and business advisory firm, headquartered in Helena, Montana, United States. The firm employs more than 200 accountants, consultants, and administrative staff.

The firm has a professional affiliation with BDO Alliance, an international association of independent accounting and law firms. Anderson ZurMuehlen has two affiliated service companies: Anderson ZurMuehlen Technology Services  and Employee Benefit Resources, Inc.

History 
Anderson ZurMuehlen and Company was founded on  October 1, 1957, by George Anderson and Carl ZurMuehlen in Helena, Montana. In 1978 the firm expanded for the first time and opened its Butte, Montana, location. Anderson ZurMuehlen acquired Gerharz and Company in 1983 and opened its Billings, Montana, office. In 2001, Anderson ZurMuehlen acquired Max Simmons & Company and opened a full service branch in Bozeman, Montana. Anderson ZurMuehlen opened a branch office in Missoula, Montana, in 2005 after acquiring McElroy, Smartt &Wilson, P.C. Anderson  ZurMuehlen opened a branch in Great Falls, Montana, in 2011, through a merger with Hamilton Misfeldt & Co. In 2014, Anderson ZurMuehlen opened an office in Havre, Montana, through a merger with Hamilton Consulting Group.

Locations 
 Billings, Montana, United States
 Bozeman, Montana, United States
 Butte, Montana, United States
 Great Falls, Montana, United States
 Havre, Montana, United States
 Helena, Montana, United States
 Missoula, Montana, United States

Business Units 
Its business units include:
Attest,
consulting services,
controller services,
employee benefit resources and
tax.

Its specialty areas and industries include:
banking,
employee benefit plans,
insurance,
nonprofits,
peer review,
Bakken Area,
construction,
agriculture,
international tax and consulting,
private foundations, trusts, estates, family wealth,
attorneys,
dental,
financial institutions,
government services,
manufacturing,
physicians,
retail, and
manufacturing and distribution.

Awards and recognition
2013 - Employer of the Year, Bozeman Business and Professional Women

2013 - Best Employer, Helena Job Service

2013 - Firm to Watch, Accounting Today

2013 - Top 200 Firms (115), Inside Public Accounting

2012 - Top 200 Firms (142), Inside Public Accounting

2011 - Top 200 Firms (133), Inside Public Accounting

2010 - Top 200 Firms (135), Inside Public Accounting

References

External links 
 Anderson ZurMuehlen & Co – Certified Public Accountants and Business Advisors

Accounting firms of the United States